"It'll Be Okay" is a song by Canadian singer Shawn Mendes. It was released through Island Records as a single on December 1, 2021. The song was written by Mendes, Scott Harris, Mike Sabath, and Eddie Benjamin. It was produced by Mendes and 
Sabath and additionally produced by Benjamin and Johan Lenox. Mendes first announced "It'll Be Okay" alongside the single's cover art and a snippet on November 30, 2021, setting its release date for the following day at 7:00 P.M. EST. A lyric video was released alongside the song.

Composition and lyrics
"It'll Be Okay" is a piano-heavy ballad that is set in the key of G major and has a tempo of 76–80 beats per minute. The song lyrically sees Mendes discuss a breakup. He starts off the song "over swelling, organ-like synths", singing: "Are we gonna make it? / Is this gonna hurt? / Oh, we can try to sedate it / But that never works, yeah". In the pre-chorus, Mendes expresses that he cannot live without his significant other after the split, which therefore has him assuring himself that it will all be alright soon: "I start to imagine a world where we don't collide / It's making me sick, but we'll heal and the sun will rise". In the chorus, he emotionally vents about his feelings from the breakup: "If you tell me you're leaving, I'll make it easy / It'll be okay / If we can't stop the bleeding, we don't have to fix it / We don't have to stay / I will love you either way (Ooh-ooh) / It'll be o–, be okay (Ooh-ooh)". Further on, in the second verse, he sings about what went to waste after the relationship ended: "Oh, the future we dreamed of / Is fading to black, oh / And, oh, there's nothing more painful".

Music video
The music video depicts Mendes walking through the streets of Toronto at night as snow falls around him.

Credits and personnel
Credits adapted from Tidal.

 Shawn Mendes – vocals, songwriting, production
 Scott Harris – songwriting
 Mike Sabath – production, songwriting, vocal production
 Eddie Benjamin – additional production, songwriting, bass
 Johan Lenox – additional production, string arrangement
 Isaiah Gage – cello
 Marta Honer – viola
 Bianca McClure – violin
 Camille Miller – violin
 Sam Kauffman-Skloff – drums
 George Seara – mixing, studio personnel
 Mike Gnocato – mixing assistance, studio personnel
 Greg Calbi – mastering, studio personnel
 Alex Pyle – recording, studio personnel
 Alisse Laymac – recording, studio personnel

Charts

Weekly charts

Year-end charts

Certifications

References

2021 singles
2021 songs
2020s ballads
Island Records singles
Shawn Mendes songs
Songs written by Shawn Mendes
Songs written by Scott Harris (songwriter)
Songs written by Mike Sabath
Songs about parting